Broken Dreams is a 1933 drama film,  directed by Robert G. Vignola. It starred Randolph Scott and Martha Sleeper. It was produced and distributed by Monogram Pictures.

The film is preserved by the Library of Congress.

Cast
Randolph Scott as Dr. Robert Morley
Martha Sleeper as Martha Morley
Joseph Cawthorn as Pop John Miller
Beryl Mercer as Mon, Hilda Miller
Buster Phelps as Billy Morley
Charlotte Merriam as Grace
Martin Burton as Paul
Adele St. Maur as Mam'selle
Sidney Bracey as Hopkins
Phyllis Lee as Nurse
Clarence Geldart as Dr. Fleming
E. J. Le Saint as Judge Harvey E. Blake
Finis Barton as Gladys
Sam Flint as Dr. Greenwood
George Nash 
Bradley Page

References

External links
 Broken Dreams at IMDb.com

1933 films
Films directed by Robert G. Vignola
Monogram Pictures films
1933 drama films
American black-and-white films
American drama films
1930s English-language films
1930s American films